Lewes is the county town of East Sussex in the United Kingdom.

Lewes may also refer to:

Places
 Lewes (district), a local government district in East Sussex in the United Kingdom
 Lewes (UK Parliament constituency), a Parliamentary constituency in East Sussex
 Lewes, Delaware, a city in Sussex County, Delaware, US
 Lewes, Prince Edward Island, see Lot 60, Prince Edward Island
 Lewes River, previous name of the upper portion of the Yukon River which runs through Yukon, Canada, and Alaska, US

People
 Lewes Lewknor, Elizabethan courtier and writer
 Lewes (surname), the name of various people

Other uses
 USS City of Lewes (SP-383), later renamed USS Lewes (SP-383), a US Navy minesweeper and patrol vessel
 Lewes bomb, a British blast-incendiary field expedient explosive device of World War II

See also
 Louis (disambiguation)
 Lewis (disambiguation)